Dominique Ramone Dorsey (born May 7, 1983) is a former professional gridiron football running back and kick returner. He most recently played for the Saskatchewan Roughriders of the Canadian Football League. He was originally signed by the Roughriders as an undrafted free agent in 2005. He played college football at Nevada-Las Vegas.

Dorsey was also a member of the Toronto Argonauts, Winnipeg Blue Bombers, and Washington Redskins.

Early years
Dorsey played high school football at Tulare Union High School in Tulare, California where he set multiple school and section records, including the record for career touchdowns (118).

Professional career

Saskatchewan Roughriders
Dorsey signed with the Saskatchewan Roughriders in 2005 and played as a backup to Corey Holmes and Kenton Keith. After Holmes was traded in the following offseason, he had a bigger role in special teams in 2006, and was named the CFL's Special Teams Player of the Week three times throughout the season.

Winnipeg Blue Bombers
Along with defensive end Dwan Epps, Dorsey was traded to the Winnipeg Blue Bombers in exchange for offensive tackle Eric Wilson on May 30, 2007. Dorsey appeared in two preseason games for the Blue Bombers before being waived on June 24.

Toronto Argonauts
On August 2, 2007, in his first ever game with the Toronto Argonauts of the Canadian Football League, Dorsey tied a league record, set by then teammate Bashir Levingston earlier in the year, for the longest missed field goal return with a 129-yard touchdown return against the Montreal Alouettes.

In 2008, Dorsey was named a CFL All-Star on special teams and awarded the John Agro Special Teams Award as the league's most outstanding special teams player. Dorsey finished the year with a league high 2,892 all-purpose yards despite missing five games due to injury.

Washington Redskins
On February 4, 2009, Dorsey signed with the Washington Redskins and played in four pre-season games before being released on September 5, 2009.

Return to Argonauts
On September 15, 2009, Dorsey returned to the Argonauts, but was injured after playing in only four games.

Return to Roughriders
On February 17, 2010, Dorsey re-signed with the Saskatchewan Roughriders as a free agent. He played in the first ten games of the season before being placed on the nine-game injured list for the remainder of the season. He was released during the following off-season.

Career statistics

References

External links
 Toronto Argonauts profile
 UNLV profile

1983 births
Living people
African-American players of Canadian football
American football return specialists
American football running backs
American players of Canadian football
Canadian football return specialists
Canadian football running backs
People from Victorville, California
Saskatchewan Roughriders players
Sportspeople from San Bernardino County, California
Toronto Argonauts players
UNLV Rebels football players
Washington Redskins players
Winnipeg Blue Bombers players
Players of American football from California
21st-century African-American sportspeople
20th-century African-American people